Francesco Reda (born 19 November 1982) is an Italian professional road bicycle racer, who is currently suspended from the sport, after testing positive for erythropoietin (EPO).

Doping
In 2013, Cosenza-born Reda rode for UCI Professional Continental Team , when he was banned after evading a doping test. His ban was reduced after he gave evidence to the Cycling Independent Reform Commission. On 15 July 2015, it was announced that Reda had tested positive for erythropoietin (EPO) after the Italian National Road Race Championships, which he finished second. In February 2016, Reda was banned for eight years.

Major results

2005
 3rd Trofeo Città di Brescia
2006
 5th Ruota d'Oro
2007
 4th Tour du Haut Var
 10th Gran Premio Industria e Commercio Artigianato Carnaghese
2008
 2nd Giro della Romagna
 2nd Trofeo Matteotti
 4th Coppa Ugo Agostoni
 5th Overall Giro della Provincia di Reggio Calabria
 6th Gran Premio Città di Camaiore
 8th Trofeo Melinda
 8th Gran Premio Industria e Commercio Artigianato Carnaghese
2009
 4th Gran Premio di Lugano
 5th Overall Tour de Pologne
 5th Overall Tour of Austria
2010
 5th Grote Prijs Jef Scherens
 9th Grand Prix Cycliste de Québec
2012
 3rd Giro dell'Appennino
 4th Giro del Veneto
 5th Overall Settimana Internazionale di Coppi e Bartali
 6th Overall Tour of Belgium
 7th Tre Valli Varesine
 7th Strade Bianche
 8th Gran Premio di Lugano
 9th Trofeo Laigueglia
2013
 2nd Trofeo Laigueglia
 3rd Overall Tour Méditerranéen
7th Gran Premio Città di Camaiore
8th Strade Bianche
2015
 1st Trofeo Edil C
 1st Stage 1 An Post Rás
2nd Road race, National Road Championships
 6th Tour de Berne
 8th Overall Istrian Spring Trophy
 9th Gran Premio della Costa Etruschi
 10th Gran Premio Nobili Rubinetterie

Grand Tour general classification results timeline

See also
List of doping cases in cycling

References

External links

Italian male cyclists
Sportspeople from Cosenza
1982 births
Living people
Italian sportspeople in doping cases
Doping cases in cycling
Cyclists from Calabria